Secret Weapons of World War II may refer to:
 Nazi Germany secret weapons
 Röchling shell
 Vergeltungswaffen
 Wunderwaffen
 Battlefield 1942: Secret Weapons of WWII, a video game expansion
 Secret Weapons Over Normandy, video game
 Secret Weapons of the Luftwaffe, video game

See also
 Secret Weapon (disambiguation)